The FC Basel 1939–40 season was the forty-seventh season since the club's foundation on 15 November 1893. FC Basel played their home games in the Landhof in the district Wettstein in Kleinbasel. Albert Besse was the club's new chairman. He took over from Emil Junker at the AGM on 15 July 1939.

Overview 
After being relegated last season for the first time in the club's history, Basel played this season in the newly reorganized 1.Liga. Due to the outbreak of World War II on 1 September 1939 the start of the Swiss football championship was postponed until 22 October and the 1. Liga postponed until December. The 1939–40 Nationalliga was played as "Championnat Suisse de Mobilisation" due to the war and the 1. Liga divided into five regional zones. There was to be no promotion and no relegation. Liga group 3 (North-West Switzerland) together with Solothurn, Aarau, Concordia Basel and FC Birsfelden. The group was played in three round-robins.

Player-manager Fernand Jaccard had left the club after the relegation season to join FC Locarno. The former players Walter Dietrich and Max Galler took over as team co-managers. Basel played a good season, in total including test matches they played 29 games, winning 22, drawing three and suffering four defeats. In total they scored 98 goals conceding 50.

After winning their four test games in October, Basel started the season well in December winning the first seven matches straight off before suffering their first defeat at the beginning of April. At the end of the group stage Basel had won nine games drawn two and were defeated just once and with 20 points were five points above second placed Aarau. Basel advanced to the play-off stage. In the semi-final they won the round-robin against group four winners SC Brühl St. Gallen and group five winners AC Bellinzona. Basel became 1. Liga champions winning the best of three final against Fribourg. August Ibach was team top league goal scorer with 19 goals, Fritz Schmidlin, Hermann Suter and Werner Wenk each scored five times.

In the Swiss Cup Basel started with a victory in the 2nd principal round away against lower tier SC Zofingen. In the next round they were again drawn away from home against lower tier SC Schöftland. This was won 4–1. In the next round Basel played in the Landhof against Aarau but were defeated and knocked out of the competition.

Players 
The following is the list of the Basel first team squad during the season 1939–40. The list includes players that were in the squad the day the season started on 1 October 1939 but subsequently left the club after that date.

 
 

 

Players who left the squad

Results

Legend

Friendly matches

Pre-season

Winter break and mid-season

1. Liga Group 3

League matches

League table

Play-offs

Semi-final (as group, three teams)

Final (best of three)

Swiss Cup

See also 
 History of FC Basel
 List of FC Basel players
 List of FC Basel seasons

References

Sources 
 Rotblau: Jahrbuch Saison 2014/2015. Publisher: FC Basel Marketing AG. 
 Die ersten 125 Jahre. Publisher: Josef Zindel im Friedrich Reinhardt Verlag, Basel. 
 FCB team 1939–40 at fcb-archiv.ch
 Switzerland 1939–40 by Erik Garin at Rec.Sport.Soccer Statistics Foundation

External links
 FC Basel official site

FC Basel seasons
Basel